The 2021–22 Sydney Uni Flames season was the 42nd season for the franchise in the Women's National Basketball League (WNBL).

In 2021, Shane Heal made his debut as the new head coach of the Flames. Keely Froling and Lauren Mansfield were named as the new Team Co-Captains. Brydens Lawyers remain as the Flames' naming rights sponsor for the ninth consecutive season.

Roster

Standings

Results

Regular season

References

External links
Sydney Uni Flames Official website

2021–22 WNBL season
WNBL seasons by team
Basketball,Sydney Uni Flames
2021 in basketball
2021 in women's basketball
2021–22 in Australian basketball